Christopher Erle (c. 1590 – 1634) was an English lawyer and politician who sat in the House of Commons at various times between 1621 and 1629.

Erle was born at Stourminster Marshall, the son of Thomas Erle of Charborough House in Dorset and his wife Dorothy Pole, daughter of William Pole of Columpton, Devon. He matriculated at Christ Church, Oxford on 10 June 1608, aged 18.  He was called to the bar at Middle Temple in 1617. Erle and his brother Sir Walter Erle were issued shares in the Virginia Company in 1620.
 
In 1621, Erle was elected Member of Parliament for Weymouth and Melcombe Regis. He shared puritan ideals with Rev. John White in Dorchester and with his brother Walter invested in the Dorchester Company. He was elected MP for Poole in 1626. In 1628 he was elected MP for Lyme Regis and sat until 1629 when King Charles decided to rule without parliament for eleven years.
 
Erle died at the age of about 44 and was buried in the middle aisle of the Temple Church on 4 April 1634.

Erle married Elizabeth Denny, daughter of Edward Denny of Stortford on 26 April 1623 at Birchanger in Essex. Their son Christopher born in 1624 was MP for Essex in 1653.

References

 

1590s births
1634 deaths
English MPs 1621–1622
English MPs 1626
English MPs 1628–1629
Members of the Middle Temple